OMB may refer to:

 East Ambae language (ISO 639-3 code: omb), an Oceanic language spoken on Ambae, Vanuatu
 Office of Management and Budget, the largest office within the Executive Office of the President of the United States
 Olympiade Mathématique Belge, a mathematical competition for students in grades 7 to 12
 OMB, a graphic design studio founded by Oscar Mariné
 Ontario Municipal Board, an independent administrative board in the province of Ontario, Canada
 Optical Media Board, a national agency under the Office of the President of the Philippines
 Oregon Marching Band, the marching band of the University of Oregon
 Oregon Medical Board, state agency responsible for establishing the rules and regulations for medicine